Slantsy ( "Oil shales") is a town and the administrative center of Slantsevsky District in Leningrad Oblast, Russia, located on the Plyussa River,  west of St. Petersburg. Population: .

History

The creation of the settlement was proposed in 1930 by Sergey Kirov, when a large oil shale deposit was discovered in the region. The construction began in 1932. The main street was named after Kirov. On December 20, 1934, rural localities of Nikolskoye and Gavrilovskoye, then a part of Polsky Selsoviet of Gdovsky District of Leningrad Oblast, were merged to form the urban-type settlement of Slantsy.

On March 11, 1941, Slantsevsky District was split from Gdovsky District and Slantsy became the district administrative center. Between August 1941 and February 1944, Slantsy was occupied by German troops. On April 5, 1949, Slantsy was granted town status. On January 1, 1963, Slantsevsky District was abolished and split between Kingiseppsky and Luzhsky Districts. On November 3, 1965, it was re-established.

Administrative and municipal status
Within the framework of administrative divisions, Slantsy serves as the administrative center of Slantsevsky District. As an administrative division, it is, together with eight rural localities, incorporated within Slantsevsky District as Slantsevskoye Settlement Municipal Formation. As a municipal division, Slantsevskoye Settlement Municipal Formation is incorporated within Slantsevsky Municipal District as Slantsevskoye Urban Settlement.

Economy

Industry
The town's name is the Russian word for shale. The town was largely sustained by oil shale mining by Leningradslanets mining company, as depicted on its coat of arms, and shale oil production by Zavod Slantsy. The mines are now largely closed due to decrease in local demand and disagreements over contracts with nearby Estonia. This has resulted in large-scale local unemployment. Furthermore, the disused mines present a serious ecological threat to water supplies in the region.

Additionally, there are construction industry (including cement plants), chemical industry, and food industry enterprises.

Transportation

A railway connects Slantsy with Gdov in the south and with Veymarn in the north. Originally, the railway connected Pskov with Veymarn. It was destroyed during World War II and the stretch between Gdov and Pskov was never rebuilt.

Slantsy is connected by roads with Pskov via Gdov and with Kingisepp. There are also local roads, with bus traffic originating from Slantsy.

Culture and recreation
Slantsy contains four objects classified as cultural and historical heritage of local significance. Three of those commemorate events related to World War II, while the fourth one is the building of the first shale mine open in Slantsy.

The Slantsy Museum of History and Culture, focusing on the history of Slantsy, is the only state museum in Slantsevsky District.

Notable people
 Larisa Peleshenko (born 1964), shot putter
 Aleksey Dmitrik (born 1984), high jumper

References

Notes

Sources

Cities and towns in Leningrad Oblast
Cities and towns built in the Soviet Union
Populated places established in 1934
Slantsevsky District
Gdovsky Uyezd